The following is an alphabetical list of notable Sri Lankan judges.



A
 A. W. H. Abeyesundere
 Maas Thajoon Akbar
 A. C. Alles
 Nimal Gamini Amaratunga
 Sarath Ambepitiya

B
 Shirani Bandaranayake

C
 Richard Cayley

D
 Oswald Leslie De Kretser II
 Oswald Leslie De Kretser III
 Thomas De Sampayo
 Asoka de Silva

E
 Chandra Ekanayake

F
 Mark Fernando
 T.S. Fernando

G

H
 Donald Danister Hewagama

I
 Ameer Ismail

J
 Eugene Wilfred Jayewardene
 Alexander Johnston

K
 Dhammika Kitulgoda

L
 Charles Ambrose Lorensz

M
 V. Manicavasagar
 Saleem Marsoof
 Richard Morgan

N

O
 Anthony Oliphant

P
 Andrew Ranjan Perera

Q

R
 T. W. Rajaratnam
 P. Ramanathan
 Parinda Ranasinghe

S
 Neville Samarakoon
 Siva Selliah
 Suppiah Sharvananda
 Sarath N. Silva
 V. Sivasubramaniam
 J. F. A. Soza
 K. Sripavan
 P. Sriskandarajah

T
 Victor Tennekoon
 H. D. Thambiah
 H. W. Thambiah
 Vincent Thamotheram
 Shirani Tilakawardene

U

V

W
 Christopher Weeramantry
 Arthur Wijewardena

X

Y

Z

See also

 
Judges
Sri Lankan
Sri Lankan judges